The Ireland East Hospital Group is one of the hospital groups established by the Health Service Executive in Ireland.

History
The grouping of hospitals was announced by the Minister for Health, James Reilly, in May 2013, as part of a restructure of Irish public hospitals and a goal of delivering better patient care. The Group was given responsibility for the following hospitals:

Greater Dublin
Mater Misericordiae University Hospital
St. Vincent's University Hospital
National Maternity Hospital
Royal Victoria Eye and Ear Hospital
St. Michael's Hospital, Dún Laoghaire
Cappagh National Orthopaedic Hospital, Finglas
St. Columcille's Hospital, Loughlinstown

Other eastern and midlands counties
Our Lady's Hospital, Navan
Midland Regional Hospital, Mullingar
St. Luke's General Hospital, Kilkenny
Wexford General Hospital

In July 2016, University College Dublin and Ireland East Hospital Group entered into a partnership to deliver improved cancer treatment.

Services
The Group is headed by a Chief Executive, who is accountable to the National Director for Acute Services in the Health Service Executive, and is responsibility for delivering inpatient care, emergency care, maternity services, outpatient care and diagnostic services at its designated hospitals. The Group’s designated cancer centres are Mater Misericordiae University Hospital and St. Vincent’s University Hospital. The Group's academic partner is University College Dublin.

References

External links

Hospital networks in Ireland
Health Service Executive
Medical and health organisations based in the Republic of Ireland